The  is a seasonal limited express train service operated by Kyushu Railway Company (JR Kyushu) in Kyushu, Japan, since October 2011.

Service pattern

The train stops at Uto Station en route.

Rolling stock
The train is formed of a specially modified 2-car KiHa 185 series diesel multiple unit set (KiHa 185-4 + KiHa 185-1012) which previously operated on Trans-Kyushu Limited Express services. The design concept was overseen by industrial designer Eiji Mitooka.

Interior
The main seating saloons retain the original 2+2 reclining seats used in the Trans-Kyushu Limited Express, with new seat covers.

History
The A-Train service was introduced on 8 October 2011.

See also
 Joyful Train

References

External links

 

Named passenger trains of Japan
Railway services introduced in 2011
2011 establishments in Japan
Kyushu Railway Company